The 2013 Maine Black Bears football team represented the University of Maine in the 2013 NCAA Division I FCS football season. They were led by 21st-year head coach Jack Cosgrove and played their home games at Alfond Stadium. They were a member of the Colonial Athletic Association (CAA). They finished the season 10–3, 7–1 in CAA play to be crowned CAA Champions. They received an automatic bid to the FCS Playoffs where they lost in the second round to fellow CAA member New Hampshire.

Schedule

 Source: Schedule

Ranking movements

References

Maine
Maine Black Bears football seasons
Colonial Athletic Association football champion seasons
Maine
Maine Black Bears football